The discography for Canadian country music group Emerson Drive consists of seven studio albums, one compilation, one EP, 33 singles, and 25 music videos. The band was formed in February 1995, under the name 12 Gauge, and released an independent debut album in 1996 titled Open Season. The group then released their second album, Until You Walk the Tracks in 1997. The album included the singles "Love's a Trip" and "Some Trains Never Come", which peaked at number 70 and number 36 on the Canadian RPM Country Tracks Chart.

In 2001, the group changed their name to Emerson Drive, signed to DreamWorks Nashville and released the third album, Emerson Drive, and issued three singles. The group later released one more album for DreamWorks Nashville, What If?, before signing to Midas Records Nashville where they released their fifth album Countrified, which contained the U.S. Billboard Hot Country Songs number one hit "Moments". The group's most recent studio album, Roll, was released in October 2012.

Studio albums

Compilation albums

Extended plays

Singles

1990s and 2000s

2010s and 2020s

As a featured artist

Music videos

Other appearances

References

Country music discographies
Discographies of Canadian artists